Rafael Ferreira Reis (born 15 July 1992 in Setúbal) is a Portuguese cyclist, who currently rides for UCI Continental team .

He was named in the startlist for the 2017 Vuelta a España.

Major results

2009
 1st  Time trial, National Junior Road Championships
2010
 Youth Olympic Games
1st  Time trial
2nd  Road race
 National Junior Road Championships
1st  Time trial
1st  Road race
 UEC European Junior Road Championships
3rd Road race
6th Time trial
 5th Overall Trofeo Karlsberg
 UCI Juniors Road World Championships
6th Time trial
7th Road race
 9th Overall Course de la Paix Juniors
1st Stage 3 (ITT)
 9th Paris–Roubaix Juniors
2011
 2nd Time trial, National Under-23 Road Championships
 7th Overall Volta ao Alentejo
2013
 1st  Time trial, National Under-23 Road Championships
2014
 1st  Time trial, National Under-23 Road Championships
 4th Time trial, UCI Under-23 Road World Championships
2015
 4th Time trial, National Road Championships
2016
 1st Prologue Troféu Joaquim Agostinho
 1st Prologue Volta a Portugal
 3rd Time trial, National Road Championships
 7th Overall Vuelta a Castilla y León
 10th Overall Volta ao Alentejo
2017
 2nd Time trial, National Road Championships
2018
 1st Prologue Troféu Joaquim Agostinho
 1st Prologue Volta a Portugal
2020
 4th Time trial, National Road Championships
2021
 Volta a Portugal
1st  Points classification
1st Prologue (ITT), Stages 1, 7 & 10 (ITT)
 3rd Overall Volta ao Alentejo
2022
 1st  Time trial, Mediterranean Games
 1st  Time trial, National Road Championships
 5th Overall Volta ao Alentejo

Grand Tour general classification results timeline

References

External links

1992 births
Living people
Portuguese male cyclists
Cyclists at the 2010 Summer Youth Olympics
European Games competitors for Portugal
Cyclists at the 2015 European Games
Sportspeople from Setúbal
Mediterranean Games gold medalists for Portugal
Competitors at the 2022 Mediterranean Games
21st-century Portuguese people